The 2001 Jade Solid Gold Best Ten Music Awards Presentation (Chinese: 2001年度十大勁歌金曲頒獎典禮) was held in January 2002. It is part of the Jade Solid Gold Best Ten Music Awards Presentation series held in Hong Kong.

Top 10 song awards
The top 10 songs (十大勁歌金曲) of 2001 are as follows.

Additional awards

References
 Top ten songs award 2001, Tvcity.tvb.com
 Additional awards 2001, Tvcity.tvb.com

Jade Solid Gold Best Ten Music Awards Presentation, 2001